Geraldine O'Hanrahans is a Gaelic Athletic Association club based in New Ross in County Wexford, Ireland.

History
The club was founded in the 1900s and takes its name from the FitzGerald dynasty and Michael O'Hanrahan, a New Ross man who died in the 1916 Easter Rising.

Achievements
 Wexford Senior Hurling Championships: Winners (2)
 1939, 1966
 Wexford Intermediate Hurling Championships: 2
 1957, 1975, 
 Wexford Junior Football Championships: 2
 1963, 2011
 Wexford Junior Hurling Championships: 1
 1995
 Wexford Minor Football Championships: 2
 1971, 1972
 Wexford Minor Hurling Championships: 6
 1931, 1932, 1933, 1935, 1936, 1940

Notable players
 Ned Colfer
 Éanna Martin
 Tom Neville
 Pat Nolan ( Wiinapeg)
 Seán O'Kennedy
 Shane Roche

Sport in New Ross
Gaelic games clubs in County Wexford
Gaelic football clubs in County Wexford
Hurling clubs in County Wexford